Mount Woolnough is a mountain over 1,400 m, standing on the north side of Mackay Glacier, about midway between Mount Morrison and Mount Gran in Victoria Land. Charted by the British Antarctic Expedition, 1910–13, and named for Walter G. Woolnough, British geologist who assisted in writing the scientific reports of the British Antarctic Expedition, 1907–09.

Mountains of Victoria Land
Scott Coast